Brian Ruckley is a Scottish fantasy author and comic book writer. He is the author of The Godless World trilogy: Winterbirth, Bloodheir, and Fall of Thanes. He'd go on to become principal writer of the current Transformers: Generation 1 comic book series for IDW Publishing, following the conclusion of the  previous continuity.

Biography
Brian Ruckley was born and raised in Edinburgh, Scotland and studied at the University of Edinburgh and the University of Stirling. He lived for a time in London but is now based in Edinburgh again.

He is currently the author of eight published works.

Four are short stories; "Farm Animal" was printed in 1993 in the British science fiction magazine, Interzone No. 74, and "Gibbons" was printed in 1999 in issue No. 20 of the magazine The Third Alternative, now called Black Static.  "Beyond the Reach of his Gods" appeared in the 2009 anthology Rage of the Behemoth from Rogue Blades Entertainment, and was reprinted in 2012 in the online science fiction and fantasy magazine Lightspeed.  "Flint" appeared in the 2010 anthology Speculative Horizons from Subterranean Press.

His first novel, Winterbirth was published in 2006 by Orbit Books in both the US and the UK. Winterbirth was followed by its sequel, Bloodheir, which was released in 2008, also by Orbit Books, as was the third book, Fall of Thanes released in 2009.

In 2011 his fourth book, a standalone historical fantasy/horror novel entitled The Edinburgh Dead was published, again by Orbit Books.

In 2014 Ruckley released a standalone epic fantasy novel entitled The Free.

Between 2019 and 2022, Ruckley was the main writer for the ongoing Transformers comic by IDW Publishing.

Bibliography

Novels
The Godless World series:
Winterbirth (2006)
Bloodheir (2008)
Fall of Thanes (2009)
Standalone:
The Edinburgh Dead (2011)
The Free (2014)

Comics
Transformers (#1–43, 2019–2022; for IDW Publishing)
Transformers Annual 2021 (one-shot, 2021)
Transformers: Fate of Cybertron (one-shot, 2022)
Transformers: Escape (#1–5, 2020–2021)
Transformers: War's End (#1–4, 2022)

Footnotes

External links
Brian Ruckley official site

Audio interview with Brian Ruckley

Interviews
Interview by SFFWorld.com

Living people
Scottish fantasy writers
Scottish short story writers
Writers from Edinburgh
Alumni of the University of Edinburgh
Year of birth missing (living people)